Lithocarpus revolutus is a tree in the beech family Fagaceae. The name is derived from the way in which the margins of the leaves are typically rolled in upon themselves (revolute). Trees in Lithocarpus are commonly known as the stone oaks and differ from Quercus primarily because they produce insect-pollinated flowers.

Description
The thick and coriaceous leaves are glabrous and distinctive because the margins are typically rolled in towards the midrib on the leaf's underside.

The fruits are large (4-5 cm long and equally large across) and sessile along the thick fruiting rachis.  The nuts are glabrous and the fruit wall can be quite thick and woody.  The cupules cover only the lower part of the nut and are flat and saucer shaped with relatively obscure squamose or muricate scales densely arranged on the outer surface.

Distribution and habitat
Lithocarpus revolutus is native to peninsular Thailand and Borneo. It is found in lower montane forests around  elevation.

References

External links
 

revolutus
Flora of Thailand
Flora of Borneo